Kenza Sosse (born 10 November 1999) is a Qatari athlete. She competed in the women's 400 metres event at the 2019 World Athletics Championships. She did not advance to compete in the semi-finals.

References

External links
 
Kenza Sosse with L'Oeil d'El Arabiya: le monde aux yeux d'une jeune femme arabe. 

1999 births
Living people
Qatari female sprinters
Place of birth missing (living people)
World Athletics Championships athletes for Qatar